Mike Mulholland is a special effects artist. He was nominated for the Academy Award for Best Visual Effects for Star Wars: The Last Jedi.

References

External links

Visual effects supervisors
Living people
Year of birth missing (living people)
Place of birth missing (living people)